Piccolomini is a prominent lunar impact crater located in the southeastern sector of the Moon. The crater is named after 16th century Italian Archbishop and astronomer Alessandro Piccolomini. The crater Rothmann lies to the west-southwest, and to the south is Stiborius. The lengthy Rupes Altai begins at the western rim of Piccolomini, curving to the northwest. It is 88 kilometers in diameter and 4,500 meters deep. It is from the Upper Imbrian period, 3.8 to 3.2 billion years ago.

The crater rim has not been severely worn by crater impacts, and the inner wall possesses wide terraces. These structures have been somewhat smoothed by landslips and erosion, most likely induced by seismic activity. An influx of material has entered across the northern rim, flowing down toward the base. The crater floor is relatively smooth, with only minor hills and impact craters. In the middle is a complex central peak surrounded by lesser mounts. The main peak rises to a height of 2.0 kilometers above the surrounding floor.

Satellite craters
By convention these features are identified on lunar maps by placing the letter on the side of the crater midpoint that is closest to Piccolomini.

See also 
 Asteroid 274264 Piccolomini

References

Impact craters on the Moon
House of Piccolomini
Imbrian